The Granville Hotel, Ramsgate, Kent, on the southeast coast of England, was a former hotel designed by Edward Welby Pugin, son of Augustus Pugin. The Granville was a hotel between 1869 and 1946 before being sold by proprietors Spiers & Pond.

The building is now Granville House, a private residence containing 48 self-contained flats that are managed by Cockett Henderson.  Granville House was Grade II listed on 16 October 1973. In 2010 the lease holders of Granville House gained the Right To Manage and are now responsible for looking after the building themselves. On 18 December 2012, at a public auction, the freehold of Granville House was purchased by Mr Eliasz Englander for £156,000.

The Granville Cinema opposite, is named after the building.

History
After the death of Augusta Emma d'Este (Lady Truro) on 21 May 1866, the remainder of the land from the Mount Albion Estate was sold off to developers.  Business partners, Robert Sankey, John Barnet Hodgson and Edward Welby Pugin purchased a plot of land on Ramsgate`s east cliff for £9,250.

In 1867, they built an eight house terrace in the gothic style.  These were substantial properties, with four floors and a basement.  Each house had a private entrance.  The houses were marketed as exclusive villas to be let for weeks at a time to wealthy visitors to Ramsgate who were expected to arrive at the nearby Ramsgate Sands station below the cliff.

The terrace, described by Catriona Blaker from her book -  Edward Pugin and Kent, his life and work within the county, 2012: "Seen from the front, the main elevation of these very substantial five floor stock brick residences was Gothic – definitely an urban, modern Gothic, not even picturesquely asymmetrical.  Each end was the same, grandly gabled, with carefully detailed stone balconies and a large and elegant Gothic window on the fifth floor, and there were bold structural bays and chimneys on the side elevations."

In 1869, the owners decided to convert the building into a hotel that was formally opened with an inaugural ball on 7 December 1869.  The new hotel was named "The Granville" in honour of George Leveson Gower, 2nd Earl Granville.

Queen Victoria, when young, had stayed nearby in what is now Albion House. Queen Victoria at some point regularly used it as a holiday home. This is evidenced by the street outside being named Victoria Parade, where Queen Victoria paraded.

The Granville was a spa hotel with over 25 different kinds of baths, including Turkish  The baths opened in December, 1871 and were the main feature of the hotel throughout its life.  These baths were later demolished in 1980.

The Granville may have contributed to Edward Pugin`s bankruptcy in 1873.  In the following years the hotel was owned by the bankers Coutts, an additional hall (new Granville Hall) was designed and completed in July, 1874 by the architect J T Wimperis.  The hall was demolished in 1982.

The hotel was purchased in 1877 by Edmund Francis Davis – a solicitor and business tycoon who twice contested the Isle of Thanet constituency for the Liberals.  Davis developed the Granville Marina below the east cliff, and inaugurated the Granville Express – a daily train service from Charing Cross to Westgate and Ramsgate Sands.   Davis also laid a marble skating rink in the Granville Gardens (now Poldark Court), and completed a tunnel begun by Pugin, from the gardens to the sands.  The tunnel exits at number 3 Granville Marina.

Throughout the 1880s and 1890s the hotel suffered frequent bankruptcies before being purchased by Spiers & Pond Ltd in December 1898.  The front elevation was altered by the architect Horace Field in 1899, the Granville Tower was lowered and the inside of the building was extensively remodelled.

In January 1915, the Granville was requisitioned by the Government and became The Granville Canadian Special Hospital. It mainly treated patients suffering from shell shock, nerve injuries and injuries to bones and joints.  In April 1917 the hospital accommodated 809 wounded Canadian soldiers.  The hospital closed in the same year and was relocated to Buxton, Derbyshire.

The Granville reopened in 1920 after a £60,000 modernisation.  It was leased to the Empire Hotels Group in the 1930s.

A corner of the hotel was destroyed by enemy action on 12 November 1940. The building had closed and was fortunately empty during the raid.  The building sits on network of caves and nearby tunnels that were modified in 1939.  The bomb damaged corner was rebuilt in 2004 by Oakleigh Developments Ltd and became Granville Court.   In 1947, the hotel was converted into flats and renamed Granville House.  For the next 30 years, the building was managed and then owned by William and Florence Hamilton.  The Granville was a popular venue for ballroom dancing in the 1950s and 1960s as William Hamilton had installed a sprung floor.  This hall, demolished in 1982, was also used as a count during elections and to host private and civic functions.  In February 1956, the basement became a jazz club called The Cave   From 1974 until the 1990s, the building passed into a number of different owners and financial backers.

A fire was ignited at the bottom of the staircase on the night of Thursday 25 April 1985.  The flames were prevented from spreading due to newly installed fire doors.  The teak staircase was destroyed but was later restored in a £1.5 million restoration program.

Public House & Banqueting Hall

The building includes a former public house named the Granville Bars, that are located on the seafront corner.  The bar closed around 1991 and is currently leased by Punch Taverns.

Adjoining the bar area is the banqueting hall - completed in October 1869 by Edward Pugin.   The centre-piece of the hall is a massive fireplace inscribed with the motto Pile on the logs to make the fire great.  The fireplace is still in situ and cost over £250 in 1869.  The hall has a segmented ceiling, and the floorboards are laid with New Zealand pine.  The banquet hall is listed on The Ramsgate Society's Buildings at Risk Register.

See also
 Historic buildings in Ramsgate

References

Ramsgate
Hotels established in 1869
Hotels in Kent
Defunct hotels in England
1869 establishments in England
E. W. Pugin buildings
Grade II listed buildings in Kent
Grade II listed hotels
Apartment buildings in England